Presser may refer to:

 Press conference, "presser" is an informal term
 Presser v. Illinois, a US court ruling on gun control
 Bram Presser (1976), Melbourne musician
 Gábor Presser (1948), Hungarian musician, composer, singer
 Harriet Presser (1936–2012), sociologist and demographer
 Jackie Presser (1926–1988), Teamster union boss involved in organized crime
 Jacques Presser (1899–1970), Dutch historian and writer
 Josef Presser (1890-1967), American artist
 Leon Presser, Hispanic businessman
 Michael Presser, theatre producer
 William Presser (1916–2004), music composer and publisher